Rosebay or rose-bay is a common name for several plants

Rosebay may refer to:

 Chamerion angustifolium, a herbaceous plant in the family Onagraceae, sometimes referred to by the common name rosebay in Britain
 Nerium oleander, a shrub in the family Apocynaceae, native to the Mediterranean region and cultivated in other warm subtropical areas
 Rhododendron, a genus of shrubs in the family Ericaceae, sometimes referred to by the common name rosebay in the United States

See also
Rose Bay (disambiguation), places named Rose Bay